Burma National Literature Awards for Translation is a literary prize awarded each year for an author who has translated from the foreign language by the government committee.
This award has been awarded since 1962 .This award has two sections : Fiction and General Knowledge.

National Literature Award for Translation (Fiction)
No awards were given in the years not listed.

National Literature Award for Translation (General Knowledge)

See also 
 Myanmar National Literature Award

References

1962 establishments in Burma
Translation awards
Burmese literary awards